The following are the national records in athletics in Bahrain maintained by Bahrain Athletics Association (BAA).

Outdoor

Key to tables:

+ = en route to a longer distance

h = hand timing

NWI = no wind information

Men

Women

Mixed

Indoor

Men

Women

Notes

References
General
World Athletics Statistic Handbook 2019: National Outdoor Records
World Athletics Statistic Handbook 2022: National Indoor Records
Specific

External links
BAA web site

Bahrain
Records
Athletics
Athletics